China participated and hosted the 2010 Asian Games in Guangzhou on 12–27 November 2010.

Medalists

Aquatics – Diving

Men

Women

Aquatics – Swimming

Men
30 swimmers

Women
22 swimmers

* Participated in the heats only.

Aquatics – Synchronized swimming

Aquatics – Water polo

Men 
Group A

Quarterfinals

Semifinals

Gold medal match

Women

Archery

Men
{| class="wikitable"  style="width:98%; text-align:left; font-size:90%;"
|-
!rowspan=2 | Athlete
!rowspan=2 | Event
!colspan=2 | Ranking Round
!Round of 64
!Round of 32
!Round of 16
!Quarterfinals
!Semifinals
!colspan=2 | Final
|-
!Score
!Seed
!OppositionScore
!OppositionScore
!OppositionScore
!OppositionScore
!OppositionScore
!OppositionScore
!Rank
|-
|Chen Wenyuan
|Individual
|align=center|1348
|align=center|5
|
|   W 4–0
|   W 6–2
|   L 2–6
| style="text-align:center;" colspan="3"|did not advance
|-
|Xing Yu
|Individual
|align=center|1348
|align=center|7
|
|  W 4–0
|   W 6–0
|  W 6–2
|  L 2–6
|   L 5–6
|align=center|4
|-
|Dai Xiaoxiang
|Individual
|align=center|1330
|align=center|13
| style="text-align:center;" colspan="7"|did not advance
|-
|Zhao Shenzhou
|Individual
|align=center|1307
|align=center|22
| style="text-align:center;" colspan="7"|did not advance
|-
|Dai XiaoxiangChen WenyuanXing Yu|Team
|align=center|4026
|align=center|2
|
|
|   W 221–201
|   W 224–220
|   W 221–214
|   L 218–222
|align=center|
|}

Women

AthleticsTotal: 70 athletes''

 Men Track eventsField eventsRoad eventsCombined events Women Track eventsField eventsRoad events Badminton

Men

Women

Mixed

Baseball

Group A

November 14, 2010 — 12:00

November 15, 2010 — 18:00

November 16, 2010 — 18:00

Semifinals
November 18, 2010 — 12:00

Bronze medal match
November 19, 2010 — 12:00

 Basketball

 Men 
Group E

Quarterfinals

Semifinals

Gold Medal Match

 Women 
Group A

Semifinals

Gold Medal Match

Beach volleyball

Men

Women

Board games

Chess

Weiqi

Xiangqi

Bowling

MenAll eventsMastersWomenAll eventsMasters Boxing

 Canoeing

 Canoe-Kayak Flatwater 

Men

Women

 Canoe-Kayak Slalom 

Men

Women

Cricket

Men
Team
Hou SifengJiang ShuyaoLi JianSong YangyangSun DuoWang DianyiWang JingWang LeiWang XinZhang PengZhang QiruiZhang XinliangZhang YufeiZhao GaoshengGroup round Best 4 teams (three of the four ICC Full Members in Asia, Bangladesh, Pakistan and Sri Lanka as well as Afghanistan who played in the 2010 ICC World Twenty20) directly entered the quarterfinals.Pool CQuarterfinalsWomen
Team
Dai ShengnanHuang ZhuoMei ChunhuaSu HuanSun MengyaoWang MengWu JuanYang YuxuanYu MiaoZhang JingjingZhang MeiZhong DuanZhou HaijieZou MiaoGroup roundPool ASemifinalsBronze medal match Cue Sports

Cycling

 BMX 

Men

Women

 Mountain Bike 

Men

Women

 Road 

Men

Women

 Track 
Sprints

Pursuits

Keirin

time trial

Points races

Dance Sports

Standard

Latin

 Dragon boat

Men

Women

Equestrian

 Jumping 

 Dressage 

 Eventing 

Fencing

Men

Women

Field hockey

 Men 
Preliminary round

Classification 5th–8th

Classification 5th–6th

 Women 
Preliminary round

Gold medal game

 Football

 Men 
Group Stage

Round of 16

 Women 
Group Stage

Both teams ended the group stage with equal points, goal difference and goal scored. A penalty shootout was therefore taken immediately after the 90-minute match to determine the group winner in which Korea Republic won.
Semifinals

Bronze medal match

Golf

Men

Women

Gymnastics

 Artistic gymnastics 
Men
Individual Qualification & Team all-around Final

Individual

Women
Individual Qualification & Team all-around Final

Individual

 Rhythmic gymnastics 

Individual Qualification & Team all-around Final

Individual all-around

 Trampoline 

Men

Women

 Handball

 Men 
Preliminary round

Placement 7th–8th

 Women 
Preliminary round

Semifinal

Gold medal match

Judo

Men

Women

Karate

Men

Women

Modern Pentathlon

Men

Women

 Roller Sports

Men

Women

Artistic

Rowing

Men

Women

 Rugby

MenPreliminary roundPool BQuarterfinalsSemifinalsBronze medal matchWomenPreliminary roundPool AQuarterfinalsSemifinalsGold medal matchSailing

Men

Women

Open

 Sepaktakraw

Men's double regu
Team
Xu MingchiYang JiapengZhou HaiyangPreliminaryGroup BMen's regu
Team
Xu MingchiGe YushengZhou HaiyangYang JiapengZhang Linye

Men's team
Team
Xu MingchiGe YushengZhou HaiyangYang JiapengZhang LinyeDing YutingJin JieLi HuanhuanWang GangWang JianPreliminaryGroup BWomen's double regu
Team
Cui YonghuiSun XiaodanWang XiaohuaPreliminaryGroup ASemifinalFinalWomen's regu
Team
Cui YonghuiGu XihuiSong ChengWang XiaohuaZhou Ronghong

Women's team
Team
Cui YonghuiGu XihuiLao TianxueLiu XiaofangLiu YanhongSong ChengSun XiaodanWang XiaohuaZhang YananZhao TengfeiZhou RonghongPreliminaryGroup BSemifinalFinal Shooting

Men

Women

 Soft Tennis

Softball

Women
Team
Lu WeiLi QiLi ChunxiaLu YingLu YiWei DongmeiZhang LifangXu MinZhou YiTan YingWang YuanZhao JingGuo JiaWang LanLi HuanPreliminariesSemifinalsFinalGrand finalSquash

Table Tennis

Taekwondo

Men

Women

 Tennis

Triathlon

Volleyball

Men
Team
Bian HongminChen PingCui JianjunGuo PengJiao ShuaiLi RunmingLiang ChunlongRen QiShen QiongYuan ZhiZhang ChenZhong WeijunPreliminaryGroup A|}

|}Second round The results and the points of the matches between the same teams that were already played during the preliminary round shall be taken into account for the second round.Group E|}

|}Final roundQuarterfinals|}Placement 5–8|}Placement 5th–6th|}

Women
Team
Wang YimeiZhang LeiYang JieShen JingsiZhou SuhongZhang XianWei QiuyueLi JuanXu YunliXue MingChen LiyiMa YunwenPreliminaryGroup A|}

|}Quarterfinals|}Semifinals|}Gold medal match|}

Weightlifting

Wrestling

Men
Freestyle

Greco-Roman

Women
Freestyle

Wushu

MenChangquanNanquan\NangunTaijiquan\TaijijianSanshouWomenNanquan\NangunJianshu\QiangshuSanshou'''

References

China at the Asian Games
Nations at the 2010 Asian Games
2010 in Chinese sport